Regional Planning Councils (RPCs) are quasi-governmental organizations that are designated by Florida law (Ch. 186, Florida Statutes) to address problems and plan
solutions that are of greater-than-local concern or scope, and are to be recognized by local
governments as one of the means to provide input into state policy development. With regard to
transportation-related issues, RPCs are empowered to provide technical assistance to local
governments on growth management matters; coordinate land development and transportation
policies in a manner that fosters region-wide transportation systems; review local government
comprehensive plan amendments, evaluation/appraisal reports, and Developments of Regional
Impacts for consistency with state and regional plans; and, review the plans of independent
transportation authorities and metropolitan planning organizations to identify inconsistencies
between those plans and applicable local government plans. RPCs are a type of Regional planning organization, specific to the state of Florida.

RPC Products
In addition to various studies of the resources of the region, the principal product of each RPC is
the Strategic Regional Policy Plan (SRPP). The SRPP identifies key regional resources and
facilities, examines current and forecast conditions and trends (including expected growth
patterns), and establishes regional goals and policies that guide a program of actions to address
identified problems and needs. An example of strategic subject areas that a SRPP may address includes affordable housing, economic development, emergency preparedness, natural resources and regional transportation.

RPCs may also be involved in a variety of other programs other than growth management, such as emergency preparedness programs planning, GIS services, statistical analysis, small business development and public health projects.

RPCs Composition
Each county in the region shall have a member on the Board of Directors of the RPC in its region and shall have at least one vote. Local governments and the Governor of Florida may appoint either locally elected officials or lay citizens, provided that at least two-thirds of the voting members are locally elected officials. Each RPC's Board may be composed of the following members:
Local elected officials (city and county commissioners).
Officials appointed by the Governor, including an elected school board member to be nominated by the Florida School Board Association.
Ex officio nonvoting members appointed by the Governor.

RPC Organization
There are 10 RPCs in the State of Florida; one for each comprehensive planning district of the state:
West Florida RPC, Pensacola
Apalachee RPC, Tallahassee
North Central Florida RPC, Gainesville
Northeast Florida Regional Council, Jacksonville
East Central Florida RPC, Orlando
Central Florida RPC, Bartow
Tampa Bay RPC
Southwest Florida RPC, Ft. Myers
Treasure Coast RPC, Stuart
South Florida RPC, Miami
Withlacoochee RPC, Ocala (Written out of existence by 2015 SB 1216; Fl Stat 186.512)

Concept of Operations
Florida’s Regional Planning Councils (RPCs) are government agencies recognized by Florida Statutes and created by Interlocal Agreements between local governments. The RPCs are available to assist in the planning and implementation of State, Federal, and Local Government programs. The staffs of the Councils represent a wide variety of skill sets and are experienced in program design. Working with the Councils through an agreement / Purchase order or contract will maximize your program dollars by ensuring your program is implemented in an efficient and cost effective manner.

The issues of public safety, education, health care, community and economic development and redevelopment, protection and conservation of natural and historic resources, transportation, and public facilities transcend the boundaries and responsibilities of individual units of government. Coordination among all levels of government is necessary to promote intergovernmental coordination and the effective allocation of resources. The RPC’s provide an effective mechanism is assisting the State in articulating its policies/programs at the regional and Local levels.

A public agency of this state may exercise jointly with any other public agency of the state, of any other state, or of the United States Government any power, privilege, or authority which such agencies share in common and which each might exercise separately. An interlocal agreement may provide for a separate legal or administrative entity to administer or execute the agreement, which may be a commission, board, or council constituted pursuant to the agreement, and a separate legal or administrative entity created by an interlocal agreement possesses the common power specified in the agreement and may exercise it in the manner or according to the method provided in the agreement. All of the privileges and immunities from liability and exemptions from laws, ordinances, and rules which apply to the municipalities and counties of this state apply to the same degree and extent to any separate legal entity, created pursuant to the provisions of this section, wholly owned by the municipalities or counties of this state, the membership of which consists or is to consist only of municipalities or counties of the State.

See also
Government of Florida
Growth management
Land use
Regional planning
Urban planning
Zoning

External links
National Association of Regional Councils
Florida Department of Community Affairs
Association of Metropolitan Planning Organizations
Florida Emergency Preparedness Association

Urban planning in the United States
State agencies of Florida